The 'Golden Reinette' is a cultivar of domesticated apple that is also known as the 'English Pippin'.

References

Apple cultivars